Ema Spencer (March 1, 1857 – September 30, 1941) was an American photographer, newspaper columnist, and teacher from Newark, Ohio. In 1898, alongside Clarence H. White, Spencer was one of the co-founders of the Newark Camera Club, an amateur photography club.

Early life 
Ema Spencer was born to Dr. Benjamin Franklin Spencer and his wife, Susan Porter Spencer, in the Licking County, Ohio village of Gratiot. She had a sister, Carolyn, and a brother, Charles Hildreth. She attended Newark High School where she graduated Valedictorian and she went on to study at the Young Ladies' Institute in nearby Granville.

Photography career 
In early 1898 Spencer and Clarence H. White co-founded the Newark Camera Club, a group of fifteen amateur photographers from the city. That fall she served as the Secretary for the newly established Ohio State Association of Amateur Photographers. Spencer's photography career continued until at least 1914 despite the Newark Camera Club's dissolution in 1906 when White left for New York.

Newspaper career 
Early in her life Spencer held a variety of jobs at the Newark Advocate. In the 1880s she was managing three of the departments at the paper. In 1916 Spencer began writing a daily column called "The Melting Pot" under the pen name "Aunt Ca'line." She continued the column for 25 years, stopping only near the end of her life.

References 

People from Licking County, Ohio
Photographers from Ohio
19th-century American newspaper people
American women columnists
19th-century women writers
19th-century American photographers
20th-century American photographers
1857 births
1941 deaths
19th-century American women photographers
20th-century American women photographers
19th-century American women